The Havelock executive council was 12th executive council of British Ceylon. The government was led by Governor Arthur Havelock.

Executive council members

See also
 Cabinet of Sri Lanka

References

1890 establishments in Ceylon
1895 disestablishments in Ceylon
Cabinets established in 1890
Cabinets disestablished in 1895
Ceylonese executive councils
Ministries of Queen Victoria